

Ilbijerri Theatre Company, formerly Ilbijerri Aboriginal and Torres Strait Islander Theatre Cooperative and also known simply as Ilbijerri, styled ILBIJERRI, is an Australian theatre company based in Melbourne that creates theatre creatively controlled by Indigenous artists.

History
Ilbijerri was founded in 1990 as Ilbijerri Aboriginal and Torres Strait Islander Theatre Cooperative by a group of Aboriginal and Torres Strait Islander artists galvanised to tell Indigenous stories from an Indigenous perspective. Ilbijerri, pronounced il BIDGE er ree, is a Woiwurrung language word meaning "coming together for ceremony".

Notable productions
 Stolen by Jane Harrison, commissioned in 1992 and first performed in a 1998 co-production with Playbox Theatre
 Jack Charles v The Crown, about the life of Jack Charles, which premiered in 2010 at the Melbourne Festival. Charles was nominated for a Helpmann Award for Best Male Actor in a Play for his performance in the play in 2012, and the play was also nominated for Best Direction of a Play. The show toured across Australia and internationally, and in 2014, Ilbijerri was joint winner of a Drover Award from APACA, and Ilbijerri Theatre, toured by Performing Lines, won the Helpmann Award for Best Regional Touring Production. and in the same year
 Beautiful One Day, a theatrical documentary about events on Palm Island (co-produced with Belvoir and version 1.0), which also played at London's Southbank Centre as part of the 2015 Origins Festival of First Nations 
Coranderrk: We Will Show the Country, is a verbatim theatre work based on historical events at Coranderrk, a former Aboriginal reserve in Victoria. Giordano Nanni and Yorta Yorta/Kurnai playwright Andrea James wrote the play, and it was co-produced with La Mama Theatre, in collaboration with the University of Melbourne. It was performed at the Playhouse at Sydney Opera House in June/July 2012.
 Coranderrk, a recreation of the 1881 Coranderrk inquiry, was co-produced with Belvoir Theatre in 2017.

Ilbijerri has given tanderrum performances to open recent Melbourne Festivals. It also creates and tours works for educational and community audiences.

See also
Indigenous theatre in Australia

References

External links 
 

Theatre companies in Australia
Indigenous Australian theatre
1990 establishments in Australia
Theatre in Melbourne